Leporidae is a family of small mammals in the order Lagomorpha. A member of this family is called a leporid, or colloquially a hare or rabbit. They are widespread worldwide, and can be found in most terrestrial biomes, though primarily in forests, savannas, shrublands, and grasslands. Leporids are all roughly the same shape and fall within a small range of sizes with short tails, ranging from the 21 cm (8 in) long Tres Marias cottontail to the 76 cm (30 in) long desert hare. Most species do not have population estimates and some are not yet evaluated for conservation status, though nine species are considered endangered and one, the riverine rabbit, is critically endangered with a population size of as low as 100. The domestic rabbit subspecies of the European rabbit has been domesticated.

The 64 extant species of Leporidae are contained within 11 genera. One genus, Lepus, contains 32 species that are collectively referred to as hares; the other eight genera are generally referred to as rabbits, with the majority – 19 species – in Sylvilagus, or the cottontail rabbits. Over one hundred extinct Leporidae species have been discovered, though due to ongoing research and discoveries the exact number and categorization is not fixed.

Conventions

Conservation status codes listed follow the International Union for Conservation of Nature (IUCN) Red List of Threatened Species. Range maps are provided wherever possible; if a range map is not available, a description of the leporid's range is provided. Ranges are based on the IUCN Red List for that species unless otherwise noted. All extinct species or subspecies listed alongside extant species went extinct after 1500 CE, and are indicated by a dagger symbol "".

Classification
The family Leporidae consists of 64 extant species in 11 genera which are divided into over 200 extant subspecies. This does not include hybrid species or extinct prehistoric species.

 Genus Brachylagus: one species
 Genus Bunolagus: one species
 Genus Caprolagus: one species
 Genus Lepus: thirty-two species
 Genus Nesolagus: two species
 Genus Oryctolagus: one species
 Genus Pentalagus: one species
 Genus Poelagus: one species
 Genus Pronolagus: four species
 Genus Romerolagus: one species
 Genus Sylvilagus: nineteen species

Leporids
The following classification is based on the taxonomy described by Mammal Species of the World (2005), with augmentation by generally accepted proposals made since using molecular phylogenetic analysis, as supported by both the IUCN and the American Society of Mammalogists.

References

Sources

 
 
 
 
 
 
 

 
leporidae
leporidae